James Lumley (c. 1706–1766), was an English Member of Parliament.

James Lumley may also refer to:
Sir James Rutherford Lumley (1773–1846), English soldier of the Bengal Army in British India
James Lumley of the Lumley baronets
James Lumley, see Extraterrestrial hypothesis